Perittopus is a genus of Riffle bug.

Species
 Perittopus asiaticus Zettel, 2001
 Perittopus breddini Kirkaldy, 1901
 Perittopus crinalis Ye, Chen & Bu, 2013
 Perittopus falciformis Ye, Chen & Bu, 2013
 Perittopus yunnanensis Ye, Chen & Bu, 2013
 Perittopus zhengi Ye, Chen & Bu, 2013

References

Veliidae
Gerromorpha genera